Michael William Wright (June 13, 1938 – January 27, 2020) was an American business executive and  Canadian football player. He served as chief executive officer of SuperValu (1981–2001) and as a director of Wells Fargo & Company.

He was educated at Saint Mark's Catholic (elementary) School, St. Thomas Academy and later attended the University of Minnesota, receiving a BA degree and later, in 1963, a JD degree. He also played football at the University of Minnesota and in the Canadian Football League for the Winnipeg Blue Bombers, winning the Grey Cup in 1961. After practicing law with the firm of Dorsey & Whitney in Minneapolis, Wright joined SuperValu, Inc., in March 1977 as senior vice president for administration. In 1978 Wright was named chief operating officer and president.

Wright was president of SuperValu until 2001, serving concurrently as chief executive officer from 1981 and chairman of the board of directors from 1982. A recipient of the 1999 Horatio Alger Award, he also served as chairman of the Federal Reserve Bank of Minneapolis. He retired as president and CEO of SuperValu in June 2001 and as chairman in June 2002.

Elected a director of Norwest Corporation in 1991, he served on the bank's board until its merger in 1998 with Wells Fargo, whereupon he became a director of Wells Fargo.

Politically, he was a member of George W. Bush for President and of the National Republican Congressional Committee.

Wright was a member of the boards of Wells Fargo & Company, Canadian Pacific Railway, Cargill, Inc., S.C. Johnson & Son, and Honeywell International, Inc. He is also a trustee of St. Thomas Academy, a former member of the University of Minnesota Law School Board of Visitors (1999–2004), and trustee emeritus of the University of Minnesota Foundation. He died on January 27, 2020.

References

1938 births
2020 deaths
American football tackles
American players of Canadian football
Canadian football tackles
Minnesota Golden Gophers football players
Winnipeg Blue Bombers players
American chief operating officers
American retail chief executives
University of Minnesota Law School alumni
Wells Fargo
Businesspeople from Minneapolis
Sportspeople from Minneapolis
Lawyers from Minneapolis
Minnesota Republicans
Players of American football from Minnesota